Iman Jordan formerly known by his stage name Mateo, is an American pop/R&B singer-songwriter from Cincinnati, Ohio. He was formerly signed to the Krucial Noise imprint on Interscope Records, label imprint of Alicia Keys producer Kerry "Krucial" Brothers.

Personal life
Iman was born in Cincinnati, Ohio, into a musical family. His grandfather, Freddy Jordan was a jazz and session guitarist at the historic King Records where he played for the likes of James Brown, Freddie King, and Charles Brown. His grandmother was a singer who toured Canada and the northeastern United States. Iman started singing at an early age and playing classical piano at age 5. He attended Morehouse College, majoring in music and business. After graduation, Iman moved to New York City where he briefly worked as a strategy consultant.

On June 21, 2016, Iman publicly came out as gay via his Instagram.  He wrote, "Over the years, I've created so many faces and have done so many costume changes just to hide the simple fact that I am who I am. I've changed my name. I've worn clothes I didn't like. I've written songs about my most meaningful relationships and changed the pronouns. All for what...to meet my assumed expectation of others." Shortly after, he changed his artist name from Mateo to his birth given name, Iman.

Early music career

2008–10: Beginnings in Los Angeles and MySpace Records
Iman eventually moved to Los Angeles, in California, where he began performing under the name Mateo and pursued a career in the music industry. He met with former MTV VJ, Quddus., who was working at MySpace Records quickly took interest and brought Iman over to the label which signed him nearly on the spot. While on MySpace records, he released a three part mixtape series entitled "Underneath the Sky", which garnered critical acclaim. The mixtape series included features from Kardinal Offishall, Teairra Mari, Fashawn, and Shawn Chrystopher. On August 13, 2009, Iman recorded a live EP entitled Get To Know Me: Live at Swing House. His video, "Get to Know Me", from the live EP was featured by MTVU, Fuse, and Music Choice. After a year and a half stint at MySpace Records, Iman decided to part ways with the label in 2010.

2010–2012: Krucial Noise signing, Love & Stadiums and Say It's So
In September 2010, he signed to Krucial Noise, the label imprint of Alicia Keys longtime producer and songwriting partner, Kerry "Krucial" Brothers. Brothers met him through Quddus during the MySpace Records days. He released his fourth mixtape Love & Stadiums on March 30, 2011, to critical acclaim. The mixtape serves as his first release under Krucial Noise and includes features from Goapele, Pusha T, Ab-Liva, Gilbere Forte, and Kardinal Offishall.

Iman released his debut single, "Say It's So", on September 21, 2011, off his EP Love & Stadiums II. The single is produced by Kerry Brothers and features additional vocals from Alicia Keys and Swizz Beatz. In September 2011, Iman shot a video for "Say It's So" in New York City, directed by David "Dahveed" Telles. The single charted independently on the Billboard 100 and reached No. 40 on the Urban chart, which garnered attention from Larry Jackson and John Ehman at Interscope Records.

2012–2015: Interscope signing, Suite 823, and "We've Met Before"
In April 2012, he officially signed to Interscope Records. While working with Kerry "Krucial" Brothers on the upcoming album, they decided to release an all original mixtape project for the summer, entitled Suite 823.  The mixtape was released on August 1, 2012, to rave reviews, featuring an appearance by Motown recording artist, Stacy Barthe.

On August 13, 2013, he released an EP entitled, "We've Met Before" which peaked at No. 3 on the iTunes R&B charts.  "How Good is Your Love" was the official single released from the EP.  The video for the single peaked at No. 6 on BET's 106 and Park and in February 2014, he performed the song on VH-1's "Single Ladies".

In February 2015, he parted ways with Interscope and Krucial Noise.

2016–2019: Sony ATV signing and self-entitled EP release

After leaving Interscope and Krucial Noise, Iman was signed to a publishing deal with Sony ATV. He garnered several high-profile placements, they include Rihanna's "Desperado", an artist feature on Robin Shulz "Uncovered" album, four songs on the critically acclaimed FOX TV show "Empire", one of which being performed by Alicia Keys and the new DJDS single, featuring Khalid.

In October 2018, he independently released his first song, "Therapy", from his self entitled EP. This was his first music release under the name Iman Jordan and since leaving Interscope. The entire EP was released on August 2, 2019, and was produced by Glashaus, the production duo consisting of Dan Glashausser and Tom Glashausser. A visual EP was created for every song on the album and released on YouTube.

The album was met with rave reviews and the song "Vibration, was featured on Spotify's Fresh Finds, Study Break, and Alt RnB playlists.

2020–2021: "Technicolor", "Social Distance", "Freedom Song" and television features

Iman released his single "Technicolor" on April 22, 2020. The song was chosen for "Hulu Has Whatever You're Feeling" 2020 campaign. His song "Social Distance" was released later that year, picking up a placement on Showtime's "The Chi".

During the height of the Black Lives Matter protests of 2020, Iman released a live recording of the soul stirring ballad, "Freedom Song". The song was later featured on ABC's 'Station 13' in the summer of 2021 and performed for ProGeorgia's Women of Color Initiative Soul Serenade.

Discography

Albums

Writing discography
{| class="wikitable"
|-
! Year
! style="width:200px;"| Artist
! style="width:300px;"| Album/Single
! Details
|-
|rowspan=1|2008
|rowspan=1|Jazmine Sullivan
| Fearless
|rowspan=1| Co-writer ("One Night Stand")
|-
|rowspan=2|2009
|rowspan=2|Mateo
|Complicated (Single)
|rowspan=2| Main Writer
|-
|Get to Know Me: Live at Swing House
|-
|rowspan=2|2012
|rowspan=2|Mateo
|Say Its So (Single)"
|rowspan=2| Main Writer
|-
|Suite 823
|-
|rowspan=1|2015
|rowspan=1|Alicia Keys
| Empire
|rowspan=1| Co-writer ("For You")
|-
|rowspan=2|2016
|rowspan=1|Rihanna
| ANTI
|rowspan=1| Co-writer ("Desperado")
|-
|rowspan=1|Serayah
| Empire
|rowspan=1| Co-writer ("Me"), Co-writer ("Starlight")
|-
|rowspan=1|2017
|rowspan=1|Robin Schulz
| Uncovered
|rowspan=1| Co-writer ("Love Me A Little")
|-
|rowspan=3|2018
|rowspan=1|The Internet
| Hive Mind
|rowspan=1| Co-writer ("Humble Pie")
|-
|rowspan=1|DJDS (featuring Khalid, Charlotte Day Wilson
| Big Wave More Fire (DJDS Album)|BIG WAVE MORE FIRE
|rowspan=1| Co-writer ("No Pain")
|-
|rowspan=1|Iman
|Iman EP
|rowspan=1| Co-writer (Silence, Therapy, How High, Vibration, Pomona, KYHU, Shallow)
|-
|rowspan=2|2019
|rowspan=1|Lena Meyer-Landrut
| Only Love, L (Lena album)|ONLY LOVE, L
|rowspan=1| Co-writer ("Sex In The Morning")
|-
|}

Mixtapes
 Underneath the Sky Mixtape Ch. 1: Presented by Mick Boogie (2009)
 Underneath the Sky Mixtape Ch. 2: Presented by DJ Felli Fel (2009)
 Underneath the Sky Mixtape Ch. 3: Presented by Tapemasters Inc. (2010)
 Love & Stadiums Mixtape: Presented by Krucial Noise (2011)
 Suite 823'' (2012)

References

External links
 

Living people
Musicians from Cincinnati
1986 births
Singer-songwriters from Ohio
21st-century American singers
American gay musicians